Ann Ree Colton (Born 1898) founded the system of Niscience, a word she coined meaning to know beyond intellectual knowledge, "superconscious knowing," she called it.

Biography and teachings 
Ann Ree Colton was born near Atlanta, Georgia in 1898.  She wrote that at age 4, she gazed at the symbols on a stained glass and experienced a "knowing" of what they meant.  She believed that when she concentrated on anything with a certain fixity, that it projected its meaning to her.

Not unlike another American clairvoyant, Edgar Cayce, her gifts were both revered by many persons, and met with skepticism by others.  The author of Edgar Cayce's biography, Thomas Sugrue, was among the many who heard remarkable stories about her.  One of his interests in Ann Ree Colton stemmed from her spontaneous answers to his every question without the need to go into trance. Her chief student, fellow teacher, and husband of 31 years, Jonathan Murro, co-wrote her biography/autobiography.

Starting in 1951 she began expounding on wide range of ideas. She felt that she needed to move from working with individuals to working in a more impersonal manner, to bring her ideas of a complete system to a broader audience. She said this system, Niscience, came from an actual heavenly, spiritual blueprint she called an archetype. These archetypes, she said, are not the archetypes described by Carl Jung.

The system of Niscience is extensive and covers many spiritual practices, such as meditation, the speaking of mantrams, dedicated fasting, mandala creation, spiritual movement, and dream research, and also encompasses philosophy, science, art, and religion.  Two of her contributions relate to her ideas of reincarnation of the soul and through this, life after death.  She said the opening of the Niscience archetype was timed to the scientific age, when a great renewal of spiritual ethics, based on the teachings of the Lord Jesus, would be needed by humanity to properly cope with scientific discoveries.  Ann Ree's teachings included the idea that humankind is to extend the essential truths of old paths, but move beyond many limitations gathered over a long descent into materiality.  She often called these times "the chaos before a golden age."  Ann Ree Colton died in 1984.

Writings 
Ann Ree Colton authored 17 books covering a variety of subjects. Three nearly completed books were published posthumously. Three additional collections of her remaining writings were organized and published by Jonathan Murro, who also incorporated his own writings in the same volumes.

Her writings may be roughly divided into the following sections.

 Three books cover overarching world themes in a prophetic vein.  She called these the red books, requesting that their covers be colored red, and she said that they are the “last will and testament of the Masters.”
The Lively Oracles
Vision for the Future
Islands of Light

 Three books covered sacred spiritual subjects and are used as part of the Niscience evening devotional worship services.  She called these the white books, requesting that their covers be colored white.  They include: a cosmogenesis of man's history from Edenic or pre-physical times; an explanation of the soul; and the story of Jesus, His disciples, and heaven.
The Soul and the Ethic
The Human Spirit
The Jesus Story

 Three books are on the subject of the inner kingdom and include writings on nature, reincarnation, and death.
Draughts of Remembrance
Men in White Apparel
The Venerable One

 
Her next writings, she said, were in a more scientific vein.  They cover dreams, ESP, Kundalini, Space and Time and the moving aspect of the Holy Spirit, which she called the Esse.

Ethical ESP
Watch Your Dreams
Kundalini West
The Third Music

 
Other writings included biographical material, and subjects such as astrology, spiritual teachers, and the akasic records of Ikhnaton.

Prophet for the Archangels (Jonathan Murro, co-author)
Galaxy Gate I and II (Jonathan Murro, co-author)
The Pelican and the Chela (Jonathan Murro, co-author)
My Son Ikhnaton (published posthumously)
The Anointed (published posthumously, Jonathan Murro, co-author)
Archetypal Kingdom (published posthumously)

References

External links
 http://www.niscience.org

1898 births
1984 deaths
New Age writers
Clairvoyants
20th-century American women writers